Reinado Internacional del Café 2017 (International Coffee Queen) beauty pageant, was held in Manizales, Colombia, on January 7, 2017. At the end of the event, the outgoing queen Maydeliana Díaz, Reina Internacional del Café 2016 from Venezuela crowned Marilú Acevedo from Mexico as her successor.

Results

Special awards

Contestants

Crossovers
Contestants who previously competed or will compete at other beauty pageants:

Miss World:
2015:  – María José Larrañaga
2016:  – Kerelyne Campigotti
2017:  – Monserrath Allen 

Miss International:
2016:  – Katherine Añazgo

Miss All Nations:
2016:  – Camila González

Reinado Mundial del Banano:
2015:  – Melissa Gustavson
2016:  – Génesis Fuentes

Miss United Continents:
2016:  – Emiri Shimizu

World Miss University:
2015:  – Ana Catarina Pereira

References

External links
 Instituto de Cultura y Turismo de Manizales
 Alcaldía de Manizales
 Feria de Manizales

2017
2017 beauty pageants
2017 in Colombia
January 2017 events in South America